Col d'Entremont (el. 1,220 metres) is a mountain pass in the Massif Central located in Auvergne, France between the towns of Dienne and Murat in the Cantal department.  It is located on the watershed between the basins of the rivers Loire and Dordogne.

Tour de France
The pass has been crossed several times by the Tour de France without being rated, usually in conjunction with the Pas de Peyrol, but was rated a Category Two climb for the 2008 Tour de France.

Appearances in the Tour de France

External links
Le col d'Entremont dans le Tour de France (French)
Climb profile from Murat (2008 Tour de France route)

Landforms of Cantal
Entremont
Transport in Auvergne-Rhône-Alpes
Mountain passes of the Massif Central